Menelaus's theorem, named for Menelaus of Alexandria, is a proposition about triangles in plane geometry. Suppose we have a triangle ABC, and a transversal line that crosses BC, AC, and AB at points D, E, and F respectively, with D, E, and F distinct from A, B, and C. A weak version of the theorem states that

 

where |AB| is taken to be the ordinary length of segment AB: a positive value. 

The theorem can be strengthened to a statement about signed lengths of segments, which provides some additional information about the relative order of collinear points. Here, the length AB is taken to be positive or negative according to whether A is to the left or right of B in some fixed orientation of the line; for example, AF/FB is defined as having positive value when F is between A and B and negative otherwise. The signed version of Menelaus's theorem states

 

Equivalently,

 

Some authors organize the factors differently and obtain the seemingly different relation
 
but as each of these factors is the negative of the corresponding factor above, the relation is seen to be the same.

The converse is also true: If points D, E, and  F are chosen on BC, AC, and AB respectively so that 
 
then D, E, and  F are collinear. The converse is often included as part of the theorem. (Note that the converse of the weaker, unsigned statement is not necessarily true.)

The theorem is very similar to Ceva's theorem in that their equations differ only in sign. By re-writing each in terms of cross-ratios, the two theorems may be seen as projective duals.

Proof 

A standard proof is as follows:

First, the sign of the left-hand side will be negative since either all three of the ratios are negative, the case where the line DEF misses the triangle (lower diagram), or one is negative and the other two are positive, the case where DEF crosses two sides of the triangle. (See Pasch's axiom.)

To check the magnitude, construct perpendiculars from A, B, and C to the line DEF and let their lengths be a, b, and c respectively. Then by similar triangles it follows that |AF/FB| = |a/b|, |BD/DC| = |b/c|, and |CE/EA| = |c/a|. So 
 

For a simpler, if less symmetrical way to check the magnitude, draw CK parallel to AB where DEF meets CK at K. Then by similar triangles
 
and the result follows by eliminating CK from these equations.

The converse follows as a corollary. Let D, E, and F be given on the lines BC, AC, and AB so that the equation holds. Let F′ be the point where DE crosses AB. Then by the theorem, the equation also holds for D, E, and F′. Comparing the two, 
 
But at most one point can cut a segment in a given ratio so F=F′.

A proof using homothecies 
The following proof uses only notions of affine geometry, notably homothecies.
Whether or not D, E, and F are collinear, there are three homothecies with centers D, E, F that respectively send B to C, C to A, and A to B. The composition of the three then is an element of the group of homothecy-translations that fixes B, so it is a homothecy with center B, possibly with ratio 1 (in which case it is the identity). This composition fixes the line DE if and only if F is collinear with D and E (since the first two homothecies certainly fix DE, and the third does so only if F lies on DE). Therefore D, E, and F are collinear if and only if this composition is the identity, which means that the magnitude of product of the three ratios is 1:
 
which is equivalent to the given equation.

History
It is uncertain who actually discovered the theorem; however, the oldest extant exposition appears in Spherics by Menelaus. In this book, the plane version of the theorem is used as a lemma to prove a spherical version of the theorem.

In Almagest, Ptolemy applies the theorem on a number of problems in spherical astronomy. During the Islamic Golden Age, Muslim scholars devoted a number of works that engaged in the study of Menelaus's theorem, which they referred to as "the proposition on the secants" (shakl al-qatta). The complete quadrilateral was called the "figure of secants" in their terminology. Al-Biruni's work, The Keys of Astronomy, lists a number of those works, which can be classified into studies as part of commentaries on Ptolemy's Almagest as in the works of al-Nayrizi and al-Khazin where each demonstrated particular cases of Menelaus's theorem that led to the sine rule, or works composed as independent treatises such as:

 The "Treatise on the Figure of Secants" (Risala fi shakl al-qatta''') by Thabit ibn Qurra.
 Husam al-Din al-Salar's Removing the Veil from the Mysteries of the Figure of Secants (Kashf al-qina' 'an asrar al-shakl al-qatta'), also known as "The Book on the Figure of Secants" (Kitab al-shakl al-qatta) or in Europe as The Treatise on the Complete Quadrilateral. The lost treatise was referred to by Sharaf al-Din al-Tusi and Nasir al-Din al-Tusi.
 Work by al-Sijzi.
 Tahdhib'' by Abu Nasr ibn Iraq.
  Roshdi Rashed and Athanase Papadopoulos, Menelaus'  Spherics:  Early Translation and al-Mahani'/al-Harawi's version (Critical edition of Menelaus' Spherics from the Arabic manuscripts, with historical and mathematical commentaries), De Gruyter, Series: Scientia Graeco-Arabica,  21,  2017, 890 pages.

References

External links 

 Alternate proof of Menelaus's theorem, from PlanetMath
 Menelaus From Ceva
 Ceva and Menelaus Meet on the Roads
 Menelaus and Ceva at MathPages
 Demo of Menelaus's theorem by Jay Warendorff. The Wolfram Demonstrations Project.
 

Affine geometry
Theorems about triangles
Articles containing proofs
Euclidean plane geometry